Arablu (also Romanized as ‘Arablū; also known as ‘Arablī) is a village in Dasht Rural District, in the Central District of Meshgin Shahr County, Ardabil Province, Iran. At the 2006 census, its population was 502, in 107 families.

References 

Tageo
Maplandia

Towns and villages in Meshgin Shahr County